Reuben (or variations thereof like Rúben, Rubén, Rubèn, Ruben, Rupen and Roupen ) is most commonly a masculine given name, or less frequently a surname.

Reuben or Reubens, may also refer to:

Places
 Reuben Township, Harlan County, Nebraska, USA
 Reubens, Idaho, USA

People
 Tribe of Reuben, an ancient tribe of Israel
 Ruben (singer) (born 1995), Norwegian singer-songwriter Ruben Markussen
 David and Simon Reuben (born 1944), British billionaire businessmen
 Paul Reubens (born 1952), American comedian and actor
 Ruben (film editor), Indian film editor

Arts
 Reuben (band), a British rock band
 Reuben Awards, presented by the National Cartoonists Society for the Outstanding Cartoonist of the Year
 Reuben (novel), a novel by John Edgar Wideman

Other uses
 Reuben's Restaurant
 Reuben sandwich, an American hot sandwich

See also

 Ruben
 Rubens (disambiguation)
 Reubens (disambiguation)
 Rubin (disambiguation)